Percy Walsh (24 April 1888 in Luton, Bedfordshire – 19 January 1952 in London) was a British stage and film actor. His stage work included appearing in the London premieres of R.C.Sherriff's Journey's End (1928) and Agatha Christie's And Then There Were None (1943) and Appointment with Death (1945).

Selected filmography

 How's Chances? (1934) - Castellano
 The Office Wife (1934, Short) - Simms
 Jew Süss (1934) - (uncredited)
 The Green Pack (1934) - Monty Carr
 Dirty Work (1934) - Customer With Umbrella (uncredited)
 The Man Who Knew Too Much (1934) - Detective Inspector (uncredited)
 Open All Night (1934)
 Death Drives Through (1935) - Mr. Lord
 The Case of Gabriel Perry (1935) - William Read
 Me and Marlborough (1935) - Naylor
 Boys Will Be Boys (1935) - Prison Governor
 Checkmate (1935) - Mr Curtail
 Brown on Resolution (1935) - Kapitan von Lutz
 The River House Mystery (1935) - (uncredited)
 Admirals All (1935) - Adm. Westerham
 King of the Damned (1935) - Capt. Perez
 The Prisoner of Corbal (1936) - Gamekeeper
 Educated Evans (1936) - Capt. Reid
 Windbag the Sailor (1936) - Captain of the 'Rob Roy' (uncredited)
 Annie Laurie (1936, Short)
 Take a Chance (1937) - (uncredited)
 Dark Journey (1937) - Captain of Swedish Packet
 Knights for a Day (1937) - Lord Southdown
 Oh, Mr Porter! (1937) - Superintendent
 It's in the Blood (1938) - Jules Barres
 The Gang Show (1938) - E.H. McCullough
 Annie Laurie (1939) - Alec Laurie
 The Four Just Men (1939) - Prison Governor
 Traitor Spy (1939) - Otto Lemnel
 Pastor Hall (1940) - Herr Veit
 Ten Days in Paris (1940)
 Let George Do It! (1940) - Schwartz - Spy Chieftain
 Old Bill and Son (1941) - Gustave (uncredited)
 Inspector Hornleigh Goes To It (1941) - Inspector Blow
 "Pimpernel" Smith (1941) - Dvorak
 Jeannie (1941) - French Customs Man
 The Common Touch (1941) - McFarlane (uncredited)
 Mr. Proudfoot Shows a Light (1941, Short) - Officer
 The Big Blockade (1942) - German
 Breach of Promise (1942) - Saxon Rose
 Secret Mission (1942) - Fayolle
 Much Too Shy (1942)
 Talk About Jacqueline (1942) - (uncredited)
 Thursday's Child ( Jan' 1943) - Charles Lennox --re-released & edited 1946
 The Adventures of Tartu (1943) - Dr. Willendorf
 They Met in the Dark (1943) - Police Sergeant
 I Live in Grosvenor Square (1945) - Merridew
 Meet Me at Dawn (1947) - Shooting Gallery Man
 The Courtneys of Curzon Street (1947) - Sir Frank Murchison
 Fame Is the Spur (1947) - Suddaby
 This Was a Woman (1948) - Professor of Music
 One Night with You (1948) - Hotel Proprietor
 The Guinea Pig (1948) - Alec Stevens
 Scott of the Antarctic (1948) - Chairman of Meeting
 Now Barabbas (1949) - Jones
 Stop Press Girl (1949) - Editor, Evening Comet
 Train of Events (1949) - District Superintendent (segment "The Engine Driver")
 Golden Salamander (1950) - Guillard
 The Happiest Days of Your Life (1950) - Monsieur Joue
 Dick Barton at Bay (1950) - Prof. Mitchell (final film role)

References

External links

1888 births
1952 deaths
Male actors from Bedfordshire
People from Luton
20th-century English male actors
English male film actors
English male stage actors